The following are the scheduled events of association football (soccer) for the calendar year 2022 throughout the world. This includes the following:
 In countries whose league seasons fall within a single calendar year, the 2022 season.
 In countries which crown one champion in a season that spans two calendar years, the 2021–22 season.
 In countries which split their league season into two championships, a system often known in Latin America as Apertura and Clausura, all championships awarded in calendar 2022.

Events

Men's national teams

FIFA
 20 November – 18 December: 2022 FIFA World Cup in 
 : 
 : 
 : 
 4th: 
 1 June: 2022 Finalissima in 
 : 
 :

AFC
 6–22 May: Football at the 2021 Southeast Asian Games in 
 : 
 : 
 : 
 4th: 
 1–19 June: 2022 AFC U-23 Asian Cup in 
 : 
 : 
 : 
 4th: 
 25 September – 20 October: 2022 AFC Futsal Asian Cup in 
 : 
 : 
 : 
 4th:

AFF
 14–26 February: 2022 AFF U-23 Championship in 
 : 
 : 
 : 
 4th: 
 2–11 April: 2022 AFF Futsal Championship in 
 : 
 : 
 : 
 4th: 
 2–15 July: 2022 AFF U-19 Youth Championship in 
 : 
 : 
 : 
 4th: 
 31 July – 12 August: 2022 AFF U-16 Youth Championship in 
 : 
 : 
 : 
 4th:

CAFA
 12–19 February: 2022 CAFA U-19 Futsal Championship in 
 : 
 : 
 : 
 4th: 
 11–20 May: 2022 CAFA U-16 Championship in 
 : 
 : 
 : 
 4th:

EAFF 
 19–27 July: 2022 EAFF E-1 Football Championship in  Japan
 : 
 : 
 : 
 4th:

SAFF 
 25 July – 5 August: 2022 SAFF U-20 Championship in 
 : 
 : 
 : 
 4th: 
 5–14 September: 2022 SAFF U-17 Championship in 
 : 
 : 
 : 
 :

WAFF
 21 – 30 June: 2022 WAFF U-16 Championship in 
 : 
 : 
 : 
 : 
 4 – 13 June: 2022 WAFF Futsal Championship in 
 : 
 : 
 : 
 4th:

UAFA
 20 – 28 June: 2022 Arab Futsal Cup in 
 : 
 : 
 : 
 4th: 
 20 July – 7 August: 2022 Arab Cup U-20 in 
 : 
 : 
 : 
 : 
 23 August – 8 September: 2022 Arab Cup U-17 in 
 : 
 : 
 : 
 :

CAF
 9 January – 6 February: 2021 Africa Cup of Nations in 
 : 
 : 
 : 
 4th: 
 21–28 October: 2022 Africa Beach Soccer Cup of Nations in 
 : 
 : 
 : 
 4th:

UNAF
 14 – 22 March: 2022 UNAF U-16 Tournament in 
 : 
 : 
 : 
 4th:

COSAFA
 5–17 July: 2022 COSAFA Cup in 
 : 
 : 
 : 
 4th:

CONCACAF
 18 June – 3 July: 2022 CONCACAF U-20 Championship in 
 : 
 : 
 : 
 :

OFC
 7 – 24 September: 2022 OFC U-19 Championship in 
 : 
 : 
 : 
 4th: 
 13 – 18 September: 2022 OFC Futsal Cup in 
 : 
 : 
 : 
 4th:

UEFA
 19 January – 6 February: UEFA Futsal Euro 2022 in 
 : 
 : 
 : 
 4th: 
 16 May – 1 June: 2022 UEFA European Under-17 Championship in 
 : 
 : 
 : 
 : 
 18 June – 1 July: 2022 UEFA European Under-19 Championship in 
 : 
 : 
 : 
 : 
 3–10 September: 2022 UEFA Under-19 Futsal Championship in 
 : 
 : 
 : 
 :

Friendly tournaments

Senior
 23–29 March: 2022 FAS Tri-Nations Series in 
 : 
 : 
 : 
 23–29 March: Tri-Nations Series in 
 : 
 : 
 : 
 23–29 March: 2022 Nouakchott Cup in 
 : 
 : 
 : 
 4th: 
 23–29 March: International Tournament in 
 : 
 : 
 : 
 25–29 March: 2022 Courts Caribbean Classic in 
 : 
 : 
 : 
 25–29 March: 2022 Navruz Cup in 
 : 
 : 
 : 
 4th: 
 10–14 June: 2022 Kirin Cup Soccer in 
 : 
 : 
 : 
 4th: 
 22–25 September: 2022 King's Cup in 
 : 
 : 
 : 
 4th: 
 23–26 September: 2022 Jordan International Tournament in 
 : 
 : 
 : 
 4th: 
 : 
 : 
 : 
 4th:

Youth
 6–13 February: 2022 Development Cup in 
 : 
 : 
 : 
 4th: 
 11–15 February: 2022 Algavre Cup U17 in 
 : 
 : 
 : 
 4th: 
 20–29 March:  in 
 : 
 : 
 : 
 4th: 
 29 May – 12 June: 2022 Maurice Revello Tournament in 
 : 
 : 
 : 
 4th: 
 8–12 June: 2022 U-16 International Dream Cup in 
 : 
 : 
 : 
 4th: 
 9–13 June: 2022 Under-19 Baltic Cup in 
 : 
 : 
 : 
 4th: 
 26 June – 5 July: Football at the 2022 Mediterranean Games in 
 : 
 : 
 : 
 4th: 
 29 June – 3 July: 2022 Under-17 Baltic Cup in 
 : 
 : 
 : 
 4th: 
 2 – 4 July: Football at the 2022 Bolivarian Games in 
 : 
 : 
 : 
 4th: 
 5–11 August: 2022 International U19 Thanh Nien Cup in 
 : 
 : 
 : 
 4th: 
 8–16 August: Football at the 2021 Islamic Solidarity Games in 
 : 
 : 
 : 
 4th:

Women's national teams

FIFA
 10–28 August: 2022 FIFA U-20 Women's World Cup in 
 : 
 : 
 : 
 4th: 
 11–30 October: 2022 FIFA U-17 Women's World Cup in 
 : 
 : 
 : 
 4th:

AFC 
 20 January – 6 February: 2022 AFC Women's Asian Cup in 
 : 
 : 
 : 
 : 
 6–22 May: Football at the 2021 Southeast Asian Games in 
 : 
 : 
 : 
 4th:

AFF 
 4–17 July: 2022 AFF Women's Championship in 
 : 
 : 
 : 
 4th: 
 22 July – 4 August: 2022 AFF U-18 Women's Championship in 
 : 
 : 
 : 
 4th:

CAFA 
 January 21–28: 2022 CAFA Women's Futsal Championship in 
 : 
 : 
 : 
 4th: 
 11 – 15 March: 2022 CAFA Women's Under-18 Championship in 
 : 
 : 
 : 
 4th:

EAFF 
 19–27 July: 2022 EAFF E-1 Football Championship (women) in  Japan
: 
: 
: 
4th:

SAFF 
 15 – 25 March: 2022 SAFF U-18 Women's Championship in 
 : 
 : 
 :

WAFF 
 16 – 24 June: 2022 WAFF Women's Futsal Championship in 
 : 
 : 
 : 
 4th:

CAF
 2–23 July: 2022 Africa Women Cup of Nations in 
 : 
 : 
 : 
 4th:

CECAFA
 1–11 June: 2022 CECAFA Women's Championship in 
 : 
 : 
 : 
 4th:

CONCACAF
 4–18 July: 2022 CONCACAF W Championship in 
 : 
 : 
 : 
 4th: 
 25 February – 12 March: 2022 CONCACAF Women's U-20 Championship in the 
 : 
 : 
 : 
 4th: 
 23 April – 8 May: 2022 CONCACAF Women's U-17 Championship in the 
 : 
 : 
 : 
 4th:

CONMEBOL
 8–30 July: 2022 Copa América Femenina in 
 : 
 : 
 : 
 4th: 
 6–14 April: 2022 South American Under-20 Women's Football Championship in 
 : 
 : 
 : 
 4th: 
 1–19 March: 2022 South American Under-17 Women's Football Championship in 
 : 
 : 
 : 
 4th:

OFC
 April: 2022 OFC U-20 Women's Championship (cancelled)
 5–31 July: 2022 OFC Women's Nations Cup in 
 : 
 : 
 : 
 4th:

UEFA
 6–31 July: UEFA Women's Euro 2022 in 
 : 
 : 
 : 
 : 
 26 June – 9 July: 2022 UEFA Women's Under-19 Championship in 
 : 
 : 
 : 
 : 
 5–15 May: 2022 UEFA Women's Under-17 Championship in 
 : 
 : 
 : 
 4th: 
 1–3 July: UEFA Women's Futsal Euro 2022 in 
 : 
 : 
 : 
 4th:

Friendly tournaments

Senior
 16–22 February: 2022 Tournoi de France in 
 : 
 : 
 : 
 4th: 
 16–22 February: 2022 Malta International Women's Football Tournament in 
 : 
 : 
 : 
 16–23 February: 2022 Algarve Cup in 
 : 
 : 
 : 
 4th: 
 16–22 February: 2022 Pinatar Cup in 
 : 
 : 
 : 
 4th: 
 16–22 February: 2022 Turkish Women's Cup in 
 : 
 : 
 : 
 4th: 
 17–23 February: 2022 Arnold Clark Cup in 
 : 
 : 
 : 
 4th: 
 17–23 February: 2022 SheBelieves Cup in the 
 : 
 : 
 : 
 4th:

Youth
 22–28 June: 2022 Sud Ladies Cup in the 
 : 
 : 
 : 
 4th: 
 26–28 June: Football at the 2022 Bolivarian Games in the 
 : 
 : 
 : 
 4th:

Club continental champions

Men

Women

National leagues

UEFA

AFC

CAF

CONCACAF

CONMEBOL

OFC

Non-FIFA

Domestic cups

UEFA

AFC

CAF

CONCACAF

CONMEBOL

OFC

Non-FIFA

Women's leagues

UEFA

AFC

CAF

CONCACAF

CONMEBOL

OFC

Non-FIFA

Women's domestic cups

UEFA

AFC

CAF

CONCACAF

CONMEBOL

OFC

Non-FIFA

Second, third, fourth, and fifth leagues

UEFA

AFC

CAF

CONCACAF

CONMEBOL

OFC

Non-FIFA

Women's second, third and fourth leagues

UEFA

AFC

CAF

CONCACAF

CONMEBOL

OFC

Non-FIFA

Men's university leagues

CONCACAF

Women's university leagues

CONCACAF

Youth leagues

UEFA

AFC

CAF

CONCACAF

CONMEBOL

OFC

Non-FIFA

Deaths

January

 3 January – 
 Oussou Konan Anicet, 32, Ivorian footballer (Makkasa, HJK, Nam Dinh), poisoned.
 Ulysses Kokkinos, 73, Turkish-born Australian footballer (South Melbourne Hellas, Melbourne Juventus).
 4 January – 
 Javier Astúa, 53, Costa Rican footballer (Puntarenas, Palestino, national team), heart disease.
 Andreas Michalopoulos, 73, Greek footballer (Panachaiki, national team).
 5 January – 
 Valeriy Gorbach, 53, Tajik footballer (Fakel Voronezh, Lokomotiv Liski, national team), heart failure.
 Marian Machowski, 89, Polish footballer (Wisła Kraków, national team).
 Shahid Uddin Ahmed Selim, 69, Bangladeshi footballer (Brothers Union, national team), oral cancer.
 Mircea Stoenescu, 78, Romanian footballer (Dinamo București) and referee.
 7 January – Jimmy Smith, 91, English footballer (Chelsea, Leyton Orient).
 8 January – Keith Todd, 80, Welsh footballer (Swansea Town, Pembroke Borough).
 9 January – 
 Viktor Chakrygin, 37, Russian footballer (Dynamo Makhachkala, Zenit Penza, Anzhi Makhachkala).
 Abdelkrim Kerroum, 85, Algerian footballer (FC Sète 34, Troyes, national team).
 10 January – 
 Alfred Gager, 79, Austrian footballer (Austria Wien, Wacker Wien, national team).
 Glyn Jones, 85, English footballer (Sheffield United, Rotherham United, Mansfield Town). (death announced on this date)
 11 January – Ahmet Yılmaz Çalık, 27, Turkish footballer (Galatasaray, Konyaspor, national team), traffic collision.
 12 January – 
 Stjepan Lamza, 81, Croatian footballer (Dinamo Zagreb, Châteauroux, Yugoslavia national team).
 Shebby Singh, 61, Malaysian footballer (Johor, Kuala Lumpur, national team), heart attack.
 Joseph Zangerle, 72, Luxembourgish footballer (Union Luxembourg, national team).
 13 January – Giacomo Vianello, 74, Italian footballer (Como).
 14 January – Lol Morgan, 90, English footballer (Rotherham United, Darlington) and manager (Norwich City).
 15 January – 
 Paul Hinshelwood, 65, English footballer (Crystal Palace).
 Robert Péri, 80, French footballer (Bordeaux, FC Metz, Toulon).
 16 January – Jamie Vincent, 46, English footballer (Bournemouth, Portsmouth, Swindon Town), heart attack.
 17 January – Jackie Fisher, 96, English footballer (Millwall, Bournemouth).
 18 January – Francisco Gento, 88, Spanish footballer (Real Madrid). 
 19 January – Hans-Jürgen Dörner, 70, East German football player (Dynamo Dresden) and manager (Werder Bremen)
 20 January – Eduardo Flores, 77, Argentine footballer (Estudiantes), cancer.
 21 January – 
 Marcel Mauron, 92, Swiss footballer (FC La Chaux-de-Fonds, national team).
 Howard Radford, 91, Welsh footballer (Bristol Rovers).
 22 January – António Lima Pereira, 69, Portuguese footballer (Porto, Maia, national team).
 24 January – Borislav Stevanović, 46, Serbian footballer (Radnički Niš, Rad, BASK).
 25 January – 
Dojčin Perazić, 76, Montenegrin footballer (Red Star Belgrade, Vojvodina, FC Den Haag).
Wim Jansen, 75, Dutch football player (Feyenoord) and manager (Feyenoord, Celtic)
 27 January – Salih Šehović, 85, Bosnian footballer (Leotar, Sarajevo, Dinamo Zagreb).

February
 
 1 February – 
 Sergei Anashkin, 60, Kazakh footballer (national team).
 Fred Cook, 74, Australian footballer (Footscray, Yarraville, Port Melbourne).
 Laurie Mithen, 87, Australian footballer (Melbourne).
 2 February – 
 Djilali Abdi, 78, Algerian footballer (national team).
 Ivano Comba, 61, Italian footballer (Sant'Angelo, Piacenza, Rondinella).
 3 February – Alex Ingram, 77, Scottish footballer (Queen's Park, Ayr United, Nottingham Forest), complications from dementia.
 4 February – 
 Davie Cattanach, 75, Scottish footballer (Falkirk, Celtic, Stirling Albion).
 Steve Finney, 48, English footballer (Swindon Town, Carlisle United, Chester City).
 Rolando Gonçalves, 77, Portuguese footballer (Porto, national team).

March
 
 3 March – Otto Schweizer, 97, German footballer (Bayern Munich)
 6 March – Frank O'Farrell, 94, Irish football player (West Ham United, Preston North End) and manager (Manchester United)
 8 March – Tomás Boy, 70, Mexican football player (Tigres UANL) and manager (Morelia, Atlas, Cruz Azul)
 31 March – Bob Todd, 72, English footballer (Wigan Athletic, Scarborough)

April
 
 13 April – Freddy Rincón, 55, Colombian footballer (América de Cali, Napoli, Real Madrid, Corinthians)
 16 April – Joachim Streich, 71, East German football player (Hansa Rostock, 1. FC Magdeburg) and manager (1. FC Magdeburg)

May
 
 1 May - Ivica Osim, 80, Bosnian football player (Željezničar) and manager (Željezničar, Yugoslavia national team, Partizan, Panathinaikos, Sturm Graz, Japan national team)
 5 May
 José Luis Violeta, 81, Spanish footballer (Zaragoza)
 Leo Wilden, 85, German footballer (1. FC Köln)

June
 
 1 June – Geoff Hunter, 62, English footballer (Crewe Alexandra, Port Vale, Wrexham)
 5 June – Haidar Abdul-Razzaq, 39, Iraqi footballer (Al-Talaba)
 9 June – Billy Bingham, 90, Northern Irish football player (Sunderland) and manager (national team, Plymouth Argyle)
 19 June – Colin Grainger, 89, English footballer (Sheffield United, Sunderland)

July
 
 2 July – Andy Goram, 58, Scottish footballer (Oldham Athletic, Hibernian, Rangers)
 4 July – Janusz Kupcewicz, 66, Polish footballer (Arka Gdynia, Lech Poznań)
 7 July – Phil Walker, 67, English footballer (Millwall, Boavista)
 11 July – Víctor Benítez, 86, Peruvian footballer (Boca Juniors, AC Milan, Roma, Inter Milan)
 15 July – Georgi Yartsev, 74, Russian football player (Spartak Moscow) and coach (Spartak Moscow, national team)
 21 July – Uwe Seeler, 85, German footballer (Hamburger SV)

August
 
 1 August –
 Milan Đuričić, 60, Serbian football manager (Vojvodina, Inđija, Radnički Niš).
 John Hughes, 79, Scottish football player (Celtic, national team) and manager (Stranraer).
 Andrejs Rubins, 43, Latvian footballer (Skonto, Crystal Palace, national team).
 Hans Weilbächer, 88, German footballer (Eintracht Frankfurt, West Germany national team).
 15 August – Lenny Johnrose, 52, English footballer (Blackburn Rovers, Bury, Burnley, Swansea City)
 28 August – Sammy Chung, 90, English football player (Watford) and manager Wolverhampton Wanderers)

September
 7 September - Piet Schrijvers, 75, Dutch football player (FC Twente, Ajax) and manager (AZ Alkmaar)
 13 September - Fred Callaghan, 77, English footballer (Fulham)
 16 September - Luciano Vassallo, 87, Ethiopian football player (Cotton Factory Club) and manager (national team)

October
 6 October - Gian Piero Ventrone, 62, Italian athletic trainer (Juventus, national team, Guangzhou, Tottenham Hotspur)
 8 October - John Duncan, 73, Scottish football player (Dundee, Tottenham Hotspur) and manager (Chesterfield, Ipswich Town)
 9 October - Yuriy Dehteryov, 74, Ukrainian footballer (Shakhtar Donetsk)
 10 October - Keith Eddy, 77, English footballer (Watford, Sheffield United, New York Cosmos)
 13 October - Stavros Sarafis, 72, Greek footballer (PAOK)
 19 October - Omar Borrás, 93, Uruguayan football manager (national team)
 20 October - Jimmy Millar, 87, Scottish footballer (Rangers)
 21 October - Masato Kudo, 32, Japanese footballer (Kashiwa Reysol, Sanfrecce Hiroshima)

November
 2 November - Ronnie Radford, 79, English footballer (Hereford United)
 12 November - Cor van der Gijp, 91, Dutch footballer (Feyenoord)
 15 November - Jimmy O'Rourke, 76, Scottish footballer (Hibernian)
 23 November - David Johnson, 71, English footballer (Everton, Ipswich Town, Liverpool)
 24 November - Neil Robinson, 65, English footballer (Swansea City, Grimsby Town)
 26 November - Fernando Gomes, 66, Portuguese footballer (Porto, Sporting Gijón, Sporting CP)
 27 November - Maurice Norman, 88, English footballer (Norwich City, Tottenham Hotspur)

December
 2 December - Assem Allam, 83, Egyptian football owner (Hull City)
 8 December - Miodrag Ješić, 64, Serbian football player (Partizan, Altay) and manager (Partizan, CSKA Sofia, Al-Ittihad Tripoli)
 16 December - Siniša Mihajlović, 53, Serbian football player (Red Star Belgrade, Sampdoria, Lazio, Inter Milan) and manager (Bologna, Fiorentina, Serbia national team, Sampdoria, A.C. Milan, Sporting CP)
 23 December - George Cohen, 83, English footballer (Fulham, national team)
 29 December - 
 Pelé, 82, Brazilian footballer (Santos, New York Cosmos, national team)
 John Jackson, 80, English footballer, (Crystal Palace, Leyton Orient)

References

External links

 
Association football by year